XHRR-FM (102.5 MHz) is a commercial radio station licensed to Reynosa, Tamaulipas, Mexico, and serving the Rio Grande Valley.  It broadcasts a Regional Mexican radio format and is known as La Ley 102.5 FM.

While XHRR-FM is a Mexican radio station, it broadcasts from studios in Reynosa and in McAllen, Texas, and airs advertisements aimed at a U.S. audience.  It is owned by Radio Ultra, S.A. de C.V. It had previously been simulcast with stations KESO and later KZSP on South Padre Island.

XHRR-FM has an effective radiated power (ERP) of 100,000 watts.  Its transmitter is off Route 2 in Rio Bravo, Tamaulipas, about five miles from the U.S.-Mexico border.  Its signal covers several Texas cities including, McAllen, Brownsville and Edinburg.

History
XHRR received its concession on July 10, 1980. It was owned by Romeo Flores Salinas. It had previously been affiliated with MVS Radio, carrying its FM Globo format until 2000 and Exa FM from 2000 to 2005.

In April 2019, R Communications sold XHCAO, XHAVO and XHRR to Radio Ultra, S.A. de C.V. The Federal Telecommunications Institute (IFT) approved the transfer on September 2, 2020.

External links
 Official website

References

Spanish-language radio stations
Radio stations in Reynosa